Joppa railway station served the suburb of Joppa, Edinburgh, Scotland, from 1847 to 1859 on the Edinburgh and Dalkeith Railway.

History 
The station was opened on 16 July 1847 by the North British Railway, although it didn't appear in any publications until Topham's Patented Railway Timetables in May 1848.

References 

Disused railway stations in Edinburgh
Former North British Railway stations
Railway stations in Great Britain opened in 1847
Railway stations in Great Britain closed in 1859
1847 establishments in Scotland
1859 disestablishments in Scotland